Maksim Vladimirovich Belyayev (born 24 August 1979) is a Kazakhstani professional ice hockey player currently playing for Kazzinc-Torpedo of the Higher Hockey League.

Belyayev began his career with his hometown team Kazzinc-Torpedo.  He would later play for another Kazakhstani team Kazakhmys Karagandy before moving to Salavat Yulaev Ufa of the Russian Superleague.  After a two-year spell he moved to Lada Togliatti, during which the RSL was replaced by the Kontinental Hockey League and Lada were entered into the new league.  During the inaugural season he returned to Kazakhstan to play for Barys Astana who also play in the KHL.  In 2009 he returned to Kazzinc-Torpedo and in 2010 he returned to the KHL joining Yugra Khanty-Mansiysk who joined the league replacing his former team Lada Togliatti.

Belyayev is also a member of the Kazakhstan national ice hockey team.

External links
 

1979 births
Living people
Kazakhstani ice hockey players
Barys Nur-Sultan players
Kazzinc-Torpedo players
Kazakhmys Satpaev players
HC Lada Togliatti players
Salavat Yulaev Ufa players
Kazakhstani people of Russian descent
Russian ice hockey forwards
Sportspeople from Oskemen
Asian Games gold medalists for Kazakhstan
Medalists at the 2011 Asian Winter Games
Asian Games medalists in ice hockey
Ice hockey players at the 2011 Asian Winter Games